Q67 may refer to:
 Q67 (New York City bus)
 Al-Mulk, a surah of the Quran